Peter Kelly (1847 – 7 April 1908) was president of the Gaelic Athletic Association (GAA) in the late 1880s.

Kelly was a native of Killeenadeema, Loughrea. He and a number of other men from the area - William J. Duffy, John P. McCarthy, John Sweeney, Loughrea; Michael Glennon, Kilchreest - asked Bishop Patrick Duggan to become the patron of the nascent GAA. Duggan declined citing his poor health, suggesting instead Archbishop Thomas Croke of Cashel. Kelly attended the foundation of the association at Thurles in November 1884. He served as umpire during the Loughrea hurling tournament of 1887, which was attended by over three thousand people. He was a member of the Irish Republican Brotherhood.

References

1847 births
1908 deaths
Gaelic games players from County Galway
Hurling umpires
People from Loughrea
Presidents of the Gaelic Athletic Association